Mike Van Camp (born February 16, 1941) is an American politician who served in the Iowa House of Representatives from the 58th district from 1983 to 1989.

References

1941 births
Living people
Republican Party members of the Iowa House of Representatives